Coleophora albacostella is a moth of the family Coleophoridae. It is found in the United States, including Texas.

References

albacostella
Moths described in 1875
Moths of North America